The 2019–20 Loyola Greyhounds men's basketball team represented Loyola University Maryland during the 2019–20 NCAA Division I men's basketball season. The Greyhounds, led by second-year head coach Tavaras Hardy, played their home games at Reitz Arena in Baltimore, Maryland as members of the Patriot League. They finished the season 15–17, 7–11 in Patriot League play to finish in a tie for eighth place. They lost in the first round of the Patriot League tournament to Lehigh.

Roster

Schedule and results

|-
!colspan=9 style=| Exhibition

|-
!colspan=9 style=| Non-conference regular season

|-
!colspan=9 style=| Patriot League regular season

|-
!colspan=9 style=| Patriot League tournament

References

Loyola Greyhounds men's basketball seasons
Loyola
Loyola
Loyola